The Kragga Kamma Game Park is a small reserve within the Nelson Mandela Bay Municipality in the Eastern Cape, South Africa.

One of the cheetahs featured in the movie Duma used to reside at Kragga Kamma. He died towards the end of November 2011 from kidney failure which is not unusual for wild cats in captivity.

The first leg of HaMerotz LaMillion 1 and the fourth leg of The Amazing Race Australia 1 included a visit to Kragga Kamma.

Fauna
The Kragga Kamma Game Park is home to the southern white rhinoceros, South African cheetah, Burchell's zebra, South African giraffe, nyala, bontebok, lechwe and African buffalo.

References

External links

 Official Website

Nature reserves in South Africa
Protected areas established in 2001
Protected areas of the Eastern Cape